RXR Realty is a real estate owner, manager, and developer headquartered in New York City. Many of RXR's holdings are located in New York City, but the firm owns buildings and development sites across the United States. RXR is a non-traded public company, and is led by Scott Rechler as CEO.
New York Governor Andrew Cuomo appointed Rechler vice chairman of the board of commissioners of the Port Authority of New York and New Jersey.

History and ownership
Scott Rechler founded RXR in 2007 after the 2006 acquisition by SL Green Realty of Reckson Associates Realty, at which he was Chairman and CEO. In December 2013, NorthStar Realty Finance Corp invested $340 million in RXR. NorthStar/RXR filed for a $2 billion IPO in February 2015, and the registration was declared effective by the SEC. In 2015, The Blackstone Group agreed to buy a 50% stake in six RXR properties located in New York State and New Jersey.

With Blackstone, the firm sold 1330 Sixth Avenue at a loss in December 2022. In February 2023, the Financial Times reported that the firm would likely return some office buildings in its portfolio to lenders. The Financial Times further reported that the firm would explore converting office buildings into housing, and noted the legal challenges and costs associated with these conversions. The firm later clarified that it was only exploring relinquishing or converting two of its office buildings. RXR did not disclose which buildings it was considering for disposition or conversion. However, the Commercial Observer identified 47 Hall Street in Brooklyn as having high vacancy rates, and Crain's New York Business reported that RXR was exploring the conversion of the Adams Express Building in Manhattan to residences. RXR has also begun lending against office and apartment assets; Rechler predicted in February 2023 the firm would originate some $2 billion in loans over the course of the year. 

RXR purchased a development site in Apex, North Carolina with homebuilder Lennar in February 2023. The plan for the development calls for housing, educational facilities, and facilities for life-sciences research.

Properties
RXR Realty owns or manages 93 commercial, residential and retail properties in the New York City area. Notable properties include:
 
1166 Avenue of the Americas, The International Paper Building, Manhattan
340 Madison Avenue, Manhattan
450 Lexington Avenue, Manhattan
237 Park Avenue, Manhattan
75 Rockefeller Plaza, Manhattan
530 Fifth Avenue, Manhattan
Adams Express Building, 61 Broadway, Manhattan
Starrett-Lehigh Building, Manhattan
620 Avenue Of The Americas, Manhattan
Standard Motor Products Building, Long Island City, Queens
470 Vanderbilt Avenue, Brooklyn
32 Old Slip, Manhattan
Helmsley Building, Manhattan
625 RXR Plaza, Uniondale, formerly known as EAB Plaza

Development
RXR Realty is a developer of real estate projects which include:
  Pier 57, Manhattan, New York. RXR Realty will develop 300,000 square feet of office space at Pier 57. 
  New Rochelle Downtown Redevelopment. The project includes development of the library, train station, offices, parks and condos.
  Garvies Point, Glen Cove, Long Island. Garvies Point is a waterfront mixed use development area with plans for condo and rental units, a marina and retail shops.
  Ritz-Carlton Residences at North Hills, Long Island.
  Ritz-Carlton Residences at Inner Harbor, Baltimore, Maryland
 Atlantic Station, Stamford CT (as RXR/Cappelli) 
 Engineers Country Club, Roslyn Harbor, New York

Attempted purchases
RXR Realty has also made news related to significant unsuccessful bids to buy New York City real estate.
 
 In October 2013, the company attempted to buy One Worldwide Plaza but lost to American Realty Capital. RXR Realty filed a $200 million lawsuit attempting to block the sale due to their claim that American Realty Capital unethically used RXR's financial analysis to form a higher bid.  The owner of Worldwide Plaza, George Comfort & Sons, claimed that RXR was unable to obtain financing to complete the purchase of the property within the allocated timeframe and this the deal had been closed.
 Also in October 2013, RXR was outbid by Shanghai-based Fosun International Ltd in their effort to acquire One Chase Manhattan Plaza.

Covid-19 pandemic support 
In March 2020, RXR Realty has contributed $1 million to support organizations and residents of New Rochelle who face the effects of coronavirus. In its initiative, RXR's collaborates with the Westchester Community Foundation.

References

Real estate companies of the United States
Companies based in New York City
2007 establishments in New York City